Edward Brooks may refer to:

Edward Brooks (EastEnders), fictional character
Edward Brooks (educator) (1831–1912), American educator
Edward Brooks (VC) (1883–1944), English recipient of the Victoria Cross
Edward Brooks (Wisconsin politician) (1942–2019), American politician
Edward Brooks, Sr., American lumber magnate, see Eastcliff (mansion)
Edward H. Brooks (1893–1978), American army general
Edward Pennell Brooks (1896–1991), founding dean of the MIT Sloan School of Management
Edward Schroeder Brooks (1867–1957), American politician
Edward Towle Brooks (1830–1897), Canadian lawyer, judge and politician
Ted Brooks (Edward William John Brooks, 1898–1960), English cricketer
Ned Brooks (footballer) (Edward A. Brooks, 1881–1958), Irish footballer

See also
Edward Brook (1895–1954), New Zealand cricket umpire
Edward Brooke (disambiguation)